Milea (also Romanized as Miléa, Milia and Miliá) is a village in the municipality of Lefktro, Messenia, Greece. The population is 102; including nearby hamlets it is 153 (2011 census).

References

Populated places in Messenia